Yoshiwara is a famous yūkaku (red-light district) in Tokyo.

Yoshiwara may also refer to:
 Yoshiwara, Shizuoka, a city in eastern Shizuoka Prefecture
 Yoshiwara Station, Fuji, Shizuoka Prefecture, Japan
 Yoshiwara (1920 film), a German silent film
 Yoshiwara (1937 film), a French drama film